The Mitsui Outlet Park Tainan is an outlet mall in Gueiren District, Tainan City, Taiwan. It started trial operations on February 16, 2022 and officially opened on February 25, 2022. Located in close proximity to Tainan HSR station and Shalun railway station, it is Mitsui Fudosan's third base in Taiwan as well as the first outlet mall in Tainan.

Development History
 On October 3, 2018, the newly established project company Sannan Outlets signed a contract with Taiwan's Railway Bureau. The development complex will be divided into two phases, the first phase will be opened in 2021, and the second phase will increase to 220 stores, and it is scheduled to start operations in 2025.
 On January 20, 2020, the groundbreaking ceremony of the project was held.

Gallery

See also
 List of tourist attractions in Taiwan
 Mitsui Outlet Park Taichung
 Mitsui Outlet Park Linkou

References

External links
 Mitsui Outlet Park Official Website

2022 establishments in Taiwan
Outlet malls in Taiwan
Shopping malls established in 2022
Shopping malls in Tainan